Pimpichaya Kokram (born June 16, 1998) is a Thai indoor volleyball player. She is a current member of the Thailand women's national volleyball team.

Career
She participated at the 2015 FIVB Volleyball Women's U23 World Championship, 2016 FIVB Volleyball World Grand Prix, 2018 FIVB Volleyball Women's Nations League, and 2018 FIVB Volleyball Women's World Championship.

Pimpichaya Kokram played the FIVB World Grand Prix, as substitute. After winning three games in Group 1 (Serbia 3-2, Germany 3-0  and Belgium 3-1 ), Thailand finished in ninth place.

Clubs
  Nonthaburi (2014–2018)
  Bandung Bank BJB Pakuan (2018–2019)
  Nonthaburi (2019–2021)
  Kurobe AquaFairies (2021–)

Awards

Individuals
 2014 PEA Junior Championship – "Best Opposite Spiker"
 2014 U17 Asian Championship – "Best Opposite Spiker"
 2015 U23 Asian Championship – "Best Opposite Spiker"
 2015 PEA Junior Championship – "Best Opposite Spiker"
 2016 U19 ASEAN Championship – "Best Opposite Spiker"
 2016 U19 Asian Championship – "Best Opposite Spiker"
 2016 Thai PBS Championship – "Most Valuable Player"
 2017 U23 Asian Championship – "Best Opposite Spiker"
 2017 Montreux Volley Masters – "Special awards Crowd favorite"
 2018 Asian Cup – "Best Opposite Spiker"
 2019 Indonesian Proliga – "Best Scorer"
Asean Grand Prix 2019 "Best Opposite Spiker"
Asean Grand Prix 2022 "Most Valuable Player"

Club
 2017 Thai–Denmark Super League -  Bronze medal, with 3BB Nakornnont
 2018 Thai–Denmark Super League -  Bronze medal, with 3BB Nakornnont
 2018–19 Thailand League -  Third, with 3BB Nakornnont
 2019 Thai–Denmark Super League -  Third, with 3BB Nakornnont

References

External links
 FIVB Biography

1998 births
Living people
Pimpichaya Kokram
Pimpichaya Kokram
Thai expatriate sportspeople in Indonesia
Thai expatriate sportspeople in Japan
Expatriate volleyball players in Indonesia
Expatriate volleyball players in Japan
Pimpichaya Kokram
Pimpichaya Kokram
Southeast Asian Games medalists in volleyball
Competitors at the 2015 Southeast Asian Games
Competitors at the 2017 Southeast Asian Games
Asian Games medalists in volleyball
Volleyball players at the 2018 Asian Games
Pimpichaya Kokram
Medalists at the 2018 Asian Games
Competitors at the 2019 Southeast Asian Games
Opposite hitters
Competitors at the 2021 Southeast Asian Games
Pimpichaya Kokram